Madagascar Skin is a 1995 British film starring Bernard Hill and John Hannah.

Plot summary
Hannah plays Harry, a very shy young gay man who has a birthmark in the shape of Madagascar across much of the left-hand side of his face. On fleeing the city and the shallow gay scene, Harry ends up at a rugged stretch of coastline where he meets Flint, played by Bernard Hill. Flint is very heterosexual and the two are wary of each other to begin with. The film focuses on how their relationship is transformed from distrust, through respect, and ultimately to attraction.

External links 
 

1995 films
1995 romantic comedy films
British independent films
British LGBT-related films
Films directed by Chris Newby
British romantic comedy films
1990s English-language films
1990s British films